Douglas Strachan (26 May 1875, Aberdeen, Scotland – 20 November 1950) is considered the most significant Scottish designer of stained glass windows in the 20th century. He is best known for his windows at the Peace Palace in The Hague, Netherlands, at Edinburgh's Scottish National War Memorial and in cathedrals and churches throughout the United Kingdom. He is also known for his paintings, murals, and illustrations.

Early life and education
Strachan was born in Aberdeen in 1875. He studied art at Gray's School of Art in Aberdeen from 1893—1894 while he worked as  an apprentice to the Aberdeen Free Press as a lithographer.  He later studied art at the Life School of the Royal Scottish Academy in Edinburgh from 1894—1895.

Career

From 1895 to 1897, Strachan worked in Manchester as a black and white artist on several newspapers, and as a political cartoonist for the Manchester Evening Chronicle. Strachan learned to work in stained glass in 1898—1899, while in Manchester, probably studying with Walter Williams, of the firm, Williams Brothers & Co., Chester, Manchester and London. Strachan returned to Aberdeen after 1897 and worked as a mural and portrait painter.

In 1899, Strachan travelled to France and Italy. He studied the art of medieval and renaissance Italy, as well as contemporary French painters. In a memoir written by Strachan's daughter, she stated that Strachan had been "enthralled by the medieval windows of Chartres—inspired above all by their luminous monumentality rather than specific details of style and technique." Strachan's European tour had a major impact on his future work as a stained-glass artist.

The two windows Strachan completed in 1900 after his return from Europe, show the influence of the art he studied on his tour and also his growing interest in stained glass of the Arts and Crafts movement.  Jesus Blessing Children (1900), South Church, St Mark's, Aberdeen and Christ in Glory and Evangelists (901), St James Episcopal Church, Aberdeen, both represent the imagery and jewel like tones of contemporary Arts and Crafts windows.

By 1909, Strachan had produced a number of stained glass works. He was hired as the head of the Crafts Section of the Edinburgh College of Art. He supervised the Applied Art department of the College, which included classes in stained glass. Strachan, and his brother Alexander, who was hired as the technical instructor of stained glass, opened a stained-glass studio-workshop in Edinburgh. The added stress of working on his own stained glass commissions while teaching and acting as department head, led Strachan to resign his position at the school in 1911. From 1911 until he retired in the 1940s, Strachan worked primarily on stained glass commissions.

Around 1928 he bought Pittendreich House, just outside Lasswade, a few miles south of Edinburgh. The house was designed by David Bryce in 1857 for Sir George Deas.

By 1929,  Strachan had won international acclaim for his work, including his four windows of 1911-13 at the Peace Palace in The Hague, Netherlands. He also added to his international reputation as an influential stained glass artist for his war memorial windows for the Scottish National War Memorial at Edinburgh Castle.

Legacy

In the Journal of Stained Glass, stained glass historian and author Peter Cormack, proposed that "there is probably no British stained glass artist who could match Strachan's ability to draw with lead".  Strachan, a contemporary of Harry Clarke (1889 -1931) in Ireland, and Christopher Whall in England, is seen as one of the three most important stained glass artists working in Great Britain and Ireland at the end of the nineteenth century and the early twentieth century.

Private life

Strachan died in Pittendreich House in Lasswade, Midlothian and is buried in the central section of the 20th century extension to Dean Cemetery in Edinburgh.

Works

Although Strachan was interested in Futurism, Cubism, and Vorticism, his work shows little influence of this. Strachan often composed his windows in areas of pure colour which were then defined by areas of silvery white. His largest commission was to design the windows for the Scottish National War Memorial in Edinburgh Castle in the late 1920s.

Strachan's work can also be seen at:
 St Aidan's Church, Bamburgh, Northumberland
 St Andrew's United Reformed Church (incl. War Memorial Window - "Sacrifice"), Hampstead, London
 All Saints, Jesus Lane, Cambridge
All Saints' Church, St Andrews
 The Peace Palace at The Hague, Netherlands
 Humbie Parish Church, East Lothian
 King's College Chapel, Aberdeen
 Noble College, University of Aberdeen
 St Machar's Cathedral, Aberdeen
 New Machar Parish Church, Newmachar, Aberdeenshire
 St Lawrence's Church, East Rounton, North Yorkshire (memorial window to Gertrude Bell
 Fraserburgh Old Parish Church (1906)
 East window (St Andrew) in the Thistle Chapel, St Giles Cathedral (1909–11)
 St Magnus Cathedral, Kirkwall, Orkney (1912)
 Nairn Old Parish Church, Nairn
 "David being anointed by Samuel", Dirleton Kirk (1916)
 St Margaret's Chapel, Edinburgh Castle (1922)
Bedrule Church (1922)
 "Christ Walking on the Water", St Giles Cathedral (1922)
 St Giles Cathedral, saint windows (1932–35)
Westminster College, Cambridge
 Bothwell Parish Church, South Lanarkshire, Gilchrist Window, for Marion Gilchrist
 St Margaret's Church, West Hoathly, Sussex
 St Thomas' Church, Winchelsea, East Sussex
 St Michael and All Angels, Waterford, Hertfordshire
 Paisley Abbey main east window (his largest work)
 St John's Kirk, Perth, Scotland
 University of Glasgow Chapel
 University of Glasgow Bute Hall
 Kilbrandon and Kilchattan Kirk, Argyll
 St Mary of the Angels, Brownshill, Gloucestershire.
 St Andrew's Episcopal Church, Kelso, Scottish Borders
 St Oswald's Church, Hotham, East Yorkshire (which contains 6 windows by Strachan)
 All Saints Church, North Cave, East Yorkshire
 The Katherine Graham Memorial Chapel situated at Dr. Graham's Homes in Kalimpong, West Bengal, India. Contains 6 windows by the artist.

References

1875 births
1950 deaths
Alumni of Gray's School of Art
Artists from Aberdeen
British editorial cartoonists
British stained glass artists and manufacturers
Scottish designers